The CAVB qualification for the 2018 FIVB Volleyball Women's World Championship was a competition for two places at the finals in Japan.

The CAVB Board of Administration meeting of 25 May 2017 decided to merge the 2017 Women's African Volleyball Championship and 2018 FIVB World Championship Continental Qualifiers. The top two teams from amongst the teams, who had registered with FIVB for the 2018 World Championship, will qualify to represent Africa in the 2018 FIVB Volleyball Women's World Championship.

Pools composition
31 CAVB national teams entered the qualification.

First round
There are seven confederation zonal competitions. The teams were distributed according to their geographical positions. The winner of each competition competed in second round.
  qualified to second round as host country in 2017 Women's African Volleyball Championship.
 Tunisia and Algeria qualified to second round as top two FIVB ranking teams. Ranking as per August 7, 2017 was shown in brackets.
  
Berths for second round

Note: Burundi, Gambia, Lesotho, Libya, Malawi, Namibia, Niger, Sudan, Tanzania, Zimbabwe, Gabon, Central African Republic, Seychelles,  Mauritius and Madagascar withdrew from zonal qualification.

Second round
The second round is 2017 Women's African Nations championship which acts also as a qualifier for the 2018 FIVB World Championship.
The top two teams from World ranking as of September 2017 and the host will direct qualify from first round. If the top two ranking teams have already qualified, the next best team from their pool would replace them in this round.

Pool standing procedure
 Number of matches won
 Match points
 Sets ratio
 Points ratio
 If the tie continues as per the point ratio between two teams, the priority will be given to the team which won the last match between them. When the tie in points ratio is between three or more teams, a new classification of these teams in the terms of points 1, 2 and 3 will be made taking into consideration only the matches in which they were opposed to each other.
Match won 3–0 or 3–1: 3 match points for the winner, 0 match points for the loser
Match won 3–2: 2 match points for the winner, 1 match point for the loser

First round

Pool A
Venue:  Bejaia, Algeria
Dates: 9–10 September 2017, both matches in Bejaia

|}

|}
Note: Tunisia and Algeria qualified to second round as top two FIVB ranking teams.

Pool B
Venue:  Gimnodesportivo Vavá Duarte , Praia, Cape Verde
Dates: 29 August 2017

|}

|}

Pool C
Venue:  Abidjan, Ivory Coast
Dates: 18–20 August 2017

|}

|}

Pool D
 DR Congo qualified for the next round. Gabon and Central Africa Republic withdrew from qualification.

Pool E
Venue:  Kasarani Indoor Arena, Nairobi, Kenya
Dates: 28–30 July 2017

|}

|}

Pool F
Venue:  Politecnica Hall, Maputo, Mozambique
Dates: 30 June – 2 July 2017

|}

|}
  qualified to second round as the runners-up of zone but later withdrew.

Pool G
 Seychelles, Mauritius and Madagascar withdrew from qualification

2017 Women's African Volleyball Championship

Venue:  Yaounde, Cameroon
Dates: 7–14 October 2017
The winner and runner-up qualified for the 2018 World Championship.

References

2018 FIVB Volleyball Women's World Championship
2017 in women's volleyball